This is a list of episodes for the anime series Initial D.

Initial D: First Stage (1998) 
Episodes in First Stage are numbered as Acts, such as "ACT.1 The Ultimate Tofu Store Drift".

Initial D: Second Stage (1999–2000)
Second Stage episodes are numbered by Acts, but go from ACT.27 to ACT.39, as if the series is treated as a continuation of First Stage.

Initial D: Extra Stage (2000)

Initial D: Third Stage – The Movie (2001)
 With his reputation growing, Takumi gets an offer of a lifetime from Ryosuke. Unsure of what decision to make, Takumi tries to find his answers by requesting a rematch with Kyoichi Sudō, leader of team Emperor, at his own homecourse.
 Takumi faces the son of an old rival of Bunta.
 As the season of Fall turns into Winter, Natsuki is determined to make her relationship with Takumi work. The unexpected arrival of an old flame of hers happens to be visiting from out of town, adding more complex problems. But if Natsuki and Takumi don’t admit to how they feel about each other honestly, then they may lose each other forever.
 When Takumi finally makes his decision, a major turning point to everyone in Initial D is about to happen ... and a new legend is about to begin.

Initial D: Battle Stage (2002)
 Battle Stage is a compilation of every major street race of 1st, 2nd, and 3rd Stage with the special addition of the never before seen battle between Keisuke's FD and Seiji's Evo IV. All the races from Stage 1 were redone using the newer, more detailed CG technology featured in Third Stage. Keisuke's FD retains some of the parts used from the Project D era (Mazdaspeed MS-02 Rims, Mazdaspeed Spoiler) but it still had its Redsuns sticker on it.

Initial D: Fourth Stage (2004–2006)

Initial D: Battle Stage 2 (2007)
 Battle Stage 2 is a compilation of races from 4th stage including never before seen battles between Keisuke's FD versus Smiley Sakai's DC2 Integra Type R, and Keisuke's FD versus Atsuro Kawai's ER34 (R34 GTT).

Initial D: Extra Stage 2 (2008)
 As Mako and Sayuki's reputation as the fastest on Mount Usui steadily grows, Mako is unsatisfied with Usui and is planning to become a pro racer.
 Iketani, now an improved street racer, yet again had a chance meeting with Mako, who gives Iketani another chance to meet with her where they first met.
 Two guys in a black Altezza challenge Mako and Sayuki in a race where they realize that the two girls are no small-time racers.
 Iketani is ready to meet with Mako as he waits for her when something happens that again results in Iketani not being able to meet Mako at the correct time. The two do meet up, after Mako picks Iketani up when he suffers a punctured tire.
 Iketani, when hearing of Mako's possible future, withholds his feelings so that Mako can make "the right decision".
 Mako makes her decision to go Pro for a year, but not without giving Sayuki, as well as Mount Usui, the run of their lives.
 At the end, after the credits, it is stated that Mako and Iketani never meet again.

Initial D: Fifth Stage (2012–2013)

Initial D: Final Stage (2014)

Initial D: Battle Stage 3 (2021)
Initial D: Battle Stage 3 is the eleventh and final installment of the Initial D series. It features every race from the Fifth Stage and the Final Stage. Unlike the previous two battle stages, it does not feature any new battles, and doesn't feature any character dialogue.

Home release
The series was released on DVD.

See also
 Initial D
 Initial D Arcade Stage

References

Episodes
Initial D